Syngrapha composita is a moth of the family Noctuidae.

External links
Syngrapha at funet

Plusiinae
Moths described in 1913